Cain is a dramatic work by Lord Byron published in 1821.  In Cain, Byron dramatizes the story of Cain and Abel from Cain's point of view. Cain is an example of the literary genre known as closet drama.

Characters

Adam
Eve
Cain, their first son
Abel, their second son
Adah, Cain's sister and wife
Zillah, Abel's sister and wife
Lucifer
Angel of the Lord

Summary
The play commences with Cain refusing to participate in his family's prayer of thanksgiving to God. Cain tells his father he has nothing to thank God for because he is fated to die. As Cain explains in an early soliloquy, he regards his mortality as an unjust punishment for Adam and Eve's transgression in the Garden of Eden, an event detailed in the Book of Genesis. Cain's anxiety over his mortality is heightened by the fact that he does not know what death is. At one point in Act I, he recalls keeping watch at night for the arrival of death, which he imagines to be an anthropomorphic entity. The character who supplies Cain with knowledge of death is Lucifer. In Act II, Lucifer leads Cain on a voyage to the "Abyss of Space" and shows him a catastrophic vision of the Earth's natural history, complete with spirits of extinct life forms like the mammoth. Cain returns to Earth in Act III, depressed by this vision of universal death. At the climax of the play, Cain murders Abel. The play concludes with Cain's banishment.

Literary influences
Perhaps the most important literary influence on Cain was John Milton's epic poem Paradise Lost, which tells of the creation and fall of mankind. For Byron as for many Romantic poets, the hero of Paradise Lost was Satan, and Cain is modelled in part on Milton's defiant protagonist. Furthermore, Cain's vision of the Earth's natural history in Act II is a parody of Adam's consolatory vision of the history of man (culminating in the coming and sacrifice of Christ) presented by the Archangel Michael in Books XI and XII of Milton's epic. In the preface to Cain, Byron attempts to downplay the influence of poems "upon similar topics", but the way he refers to Paradise Lost suggests its formative influence: "Since I was twenty, I have never read Milton; but I had read him so frequently before, that this may make little difference."

Other influences
As Byron himself notes in the preface to Cain, Cain's vision in Act II was inspired by the theory of catastrophism. In an attempt to explain large gaps in the fossil record, catastrophists posited that the history of the Earth was punctuated with violent upheavals that had destroyed its flora and fauna. Byron read about catastrophism in an 1813 English translation of some early work by French natural historian Georges Cuvier. Other influences include The Divine Legation of Moses by William Warburton and A Philosophical Enquiry into the Origin of Our Ideas of the Sublime and Beautiful by Edmund Burke.

Notes

References

Byron, The Major Works, ed. Jerome J. McGann (Oxford: Oxford University Press, 1986).

External links
 Cain by George Gordon, Lord Byron
 Cain: A Mystery, The Poetical Works of Lord Byron, vol 5. Edited by Ernest Hartley Coleridge, Charles Scribner's Sons, NY, NY 1901.
 

Plays by Lord Byron
Plays based on the Bible
1821 plays
Cultural depictions of Cain and Abel
Cultural depictions of Adam and Eve
Fiction about the Devil
Closet drama